Le Conseil scolaire catholique de district des Grandes-Rivières ("CSCDGR") is a French Catholic school board situated in northern Ontario. The easternmost region of the school board starts in Haileybury. The board covers much of the northern corridor of Highway 11 reaching as far north as Hearst. In the central region of this board is the community of Timmins. The CSCDGR administers schools in an area of 25,000 square kilometres.

The name of the school board was recommended by a former trustee, Jos Matkos. It refers to the many great rivers which run through the area.

The Logo

The logo of the CSCDGR was created by Carmel Arsenault, a local teacher. It represents the different riches found in the region; mining, agriculture and forestry. The colours are also symbolic: green represents forestry as well as renewal and hope; blue represents water not only from the rivers, is a symbol of baptism and also represents the calm northeastern skies of the region; and yellow represents wheat and agriculture, as well as joy for life that is lived in the region.

Elementary schools
 école catholique Pavillon St-Joseph, Cochrane
 école catholique Sts-Martyrs-Canadiens, Iroquois Falls
 école catholique Ste-Thérèse, Ramore
 école catholique Pavillon Notre-Dame, Hearst
 école catholique St-Louis, Hearst
 école catholique St-François-Xavier, Mattice
 école catholique Ste-Anne, Hearst
 école catholique André-Cary, Kapuskasing
 école catholique Jacques-Cartier, Kapuskasing
 école catholique Ste-Rita, Val Rita
 école catholique St-Antoine-de-Padoue, Opasatika
 école catholique St-Jules, Moonbeam
 école catholique Georges-Vanier, Smooth Rock Falls
 école catholique Assomption, Earlton
 école catholique Assomption, Kirkland Lake
 école catholique St-Louis, Virginiatown
 école catholique Ste-Croix, Haileybury
 école catholique St-Michel, New Liskeard
 école catholique Anicet-Morin, Timmins
 école catholique Don-Bosco, Timmins
 école catholique Sacré-Coeur, Timmins
 école catholique Jacques-Cartier, Timmins
 école catholique Louis-Rhéaume, Timmins
 école catholique St-Dominique, Timmins
 école catholique St-Gérard, Timmins
 école catholique St-Jude, Porcupine

Secondary schools
 école catholique Nouveau-Regard, Cochrane
 école secondaire catholique l'Alliance, Iroquois Falls
 école secondaire catholique de Hearst, Hearst
 école secondaire catholique Cité des Jeunes, Kapuskasing
 école catholique Georges-Vanier, Smooth Rock Falls
 école secondaire catholique l'Envolée du Nord, Kirkland Lake
 école secondaire catholique Thériault, Timmins
 école secondaire catholique Sainte-Marie, New Liskeard
 centre d'éducation des Adultes, New Liskeard
 La Clef, Timmins
 Centre d'éducation permanente, Kapuskasing

See also
List of school districts in Ontario
List of high schools in Ontario

References

French-language school districts in Ontario
Roman Catholic school districts in Ontario
Education in Timmins